Talsaclidine (WAL-2014) is a non-selective muscarinic acetylcholine receptor agonist which acts as a full agonist at the M1 subtype, and as a partial agonist at the M2 and M3 subtypes. It was under development for the treatment of Alzheimer's disease but showed only modest or poor efficacy in rhesus monkeys and humans, respectively, perhaps due to an array of dose-limiting side effects including increased heart rate and blood pressure, increased salivation, urinary frequency and burning upon urination, increased lacrimation and nasal secretion, abnormal accommodation, heartburn, upset stomach as well as cramps, nausea, vomiting and diarrhea, excessive sweating and palpitations.

See also 
 Aceclidine
 Vedaclidine

References 

Muscarinic agonists
Quinuclidines
Propargyl compounds
ethers